Envoy of Lucifer is the fourth full-length studio album from Swedish black metal band Nifelheim. Released in 2007, it is their first (and so far, only) album for Regain Records after they switched from Black Sun following the release of Servants of Darkness in 2000.

For the recording, the band enlisted some special guests; Erik Danielsson from the black metal band Watain co-wrote two songs here, while Set Teitan provided lyrics for one song here and handled additional screaming.

Track listing 
All songs written by Hellbutcher and Tyrant, except where noted.
"Infernal Flame of Destruction" - 4:14
"Evocation of the End" - 2:18
"Open the Gates of Damnation" - 4:31
"Claws of Death" (Hellbutcher, Tyrant, Erik Danielsson) - 5:02
"Storm of the Reaper" (Hellbutcher, Tyrant, Danielsson) - 4:15
"Envoy of Lucifer" (Hellbutcher, Tyrant, Set Teitan) - 3:27
"Evil Is Eternal" - 3:59
"Raging Flames" - 4:18
"Belial's Prey" - 4:23
"No More Life" - 7:33

Personnel

Nifelheim 
 Per "Hellbutcher" Gustavsson: Vocals (Satanic Ritual Proclamation)
 Sebastian "Vengeance From Beyond" Ramstedt: Lead & rhythm guitars (Raging Death)
 Johan "Apocalyptic Devastator" Bergebäck: Lead & rhythm guitars (Savage Violation)
 Eric "Tyrant" Gustavsson: Bass
 Peter "Insulter of Jesus Christ!" Stjärnvind: Drums, percussion

Additional personnel 
 Set Teitan: Additional screaming and vocal backing

Production 
 Arranged by Nifelheim
 Produced by Nifelheim and Micke Borg
 Engineered by Micke Borg
 Mixed by Micke Borg, Hellbutcher and Tyrant
 Mastered by Peter in de Betou at Tailor Maid Studios (4 August 2007 in Stockholm)

References 

2007 albums
Nifelheim albums
Regain Records albums